A double pass is a trick play in American football. A double pass is a lateral thrown out wide with a second pass then thrown downfield. The play starts with the quarterback throwing an overhand lateral, called a screen pass, to a player split wide. That player then throws a forward pass downfield to a third player. A variation of the play has the second downfield pass caught by the quarterback, who leaks out after throwing the initial screen to the player split wide. This often works well, because of the likelihood of the player being uncovered, as normally quarterbacks rarely run pass patterns.

Despite having a relatively high success rate, the double pass is considered one of the riskiest types of plays in football because the first pass must be a lateral, and if a lateral is dropped, it is a fumble (which may be recovered by the defending team) rather than an incomplete pass (which stops play).

A contemporary example of this play being successfully executed comes from the regular season game between University of Nebraska–Lincoln and University of Oklahoma on September 17, 2022, in which Oklahoma tight end Brayden Willis caught a lateral throw from the quarterback, then made a forward pass to a third player, who received it for a touchdown against Nebraska.

References

American football plays